Phantasmarana jordanensis is a species of frog in the family Hylodidae. It is endemic to southeastern Brazil and only known from its type locality, Campos do Jordão in the São Paulo state.
Its natural habitat is forest at  asl.

It was formerly placed in the genus Megaelosia, but was reclassified to Phantasmarana in 2021.

References

jordanensis
Endemic fauna of Brazil
Amphibians of Brazil
Taxonomy articles created by Polbot
Amphibians described in 1983